Rupert Goold  (born 18 February 1972) is an English director who works primarily in theatre. He is the artistic director of the Almeida Theatre, and was the artistic director of Headlong Theatre Company (2005–2013).

Early years 
Goold was born in Highgate, England, a suburb of north London. His father was a management consultant, and his mother was an author of children's books. He attended the independent University College School, graduated from Trinity College, Cambridge in 1994 with a First in English literature and studied performance studies at New York University on a Fulbright Scholarship. He was trainee director at Donmar Warehouse for the 1995 season, and assisted on productions including 'Art' and Speed-the-Plow in the West End.

Career 
Goold was artistic director of the Royal and Derngate Theatres in Northampton from 2000 to 2005. Prior to that, he was an associate at the Salisbury Playhouse in 1996–97. In addition to his work as a director he has co-authored three adaptations for the stage.

Goold directed Sir Patrick Stewart (whom he had previously directed as Prospero, and later in Richard II) as Macbeth in his acclaimed Minerva Studio staging of Macbeth at the Chichester Festival Theatre in May 2007. 

In September 2007, the production transferred to the Gielgud Theatre in London, then the Brooklyn Academy of Music, New York and then to the Lyceum Theater on Broadway. At the 2007 Evening Standard Theatre Awards, Macbeth won two awards: Stewart won the Best Actor Award, while Goold won The Sydney Edwards Award for Best Director. It also won Goold a 2008 Olivier Award for Best Director. He says he was not concerned with thoughts of a career anti-climax. "I came home to an empty house after the Olivier Awards, clutching my trophy for Best Director and I realised that I'd peaked. It was now going to be downhill all the way. But I still felt quite comfortable with the realisation that nothing could get better after this." He later directed a 2010 BBC4 television film version of Macbeth using Soviet-era Russian-type uniforms and weapons.

In 2008, he directed the UK premiere of Stephen Adly Guirgis's The Last Days of Judas Iscariot and a radical re-interpretation of Pirandello's Six Characters in Search of an Author at the Chichester Festival which he co-authored with Ben Power. This production subsequently transferred to the West End and toured the UK and later Australia. In 2009 he directed a hugely acclaimed West End revival of Lionel Bart's Oliver! Produced by Cameron Mackintosh, Goold recreated Sam Mendes' direction for the London Palladium production, which was nominated for three Olivier Awards.

In 2009, Goold directed a revival of Shakespeare's King Lear at the Young Vic. Goold set his Lear in Northern England during the 1970s, fascinated by the fact that during this decade, Britain was enduring the power of women. He approached the play with a drastically different view, and as a result this production received mixed reviews. In 2009, he again won Best Director at the Evening Standard Awards for ENRON.

Since 2010, Goold been an associate director at the Royal Shakespeare Company.

His opera credits include productions at Batignano Opera Festival and Garsington.

Goold was appointed Commander of the Order of the British Empire (CBE) in the 2017 New Year Honours for services to drama.

Personal life 
Goold is married to actress Kate Fleetwood. The couple met while working together on a production of Romeo and Juliet. They have one son, Raphael, and a daughter, Constance.

Stage productions 
 Directing

 Travels with My Aunt (1997, Salisbury Playhouse / UK tour)
 The End of the Affair (1997, Salisbury Playhouse / Bridewell Theatre)
 Romeo and Juliet (1998, UK tour)
 Dancing at Lughnasa (1998, Salisbury Playhouse)
 Summer Lightning (1998, Salisbury Playhouse)
 Habeas Corpus (1999, Salisbury Playhouse)
 The Colonel Bird (1999, Gate Theatre)
 Broken Glass (1999, Salisbury Playhouse/ Watford Palace Theatre)
 Gone To LA (2000, Hampstead Theatre)
 Privates on Parade (2001, New Vic Theatre)
 Scaramouche Jones (2001, international tour)
 The Wind in the Willows (2001, Birmingham Rep)
 Arcadia (2002, Northampton)
 Betrayal (2002, Northampton)
 Waiting for Godot/ The Weir (2003, Northampton)
 Sunday Father (2003, Hampstead Theatre)
 Othello (2003, Northampton/ Greenwich Theatre)
 Insignificance (2004, Northampton)
 Summer Lightning (2004, Northampton)
 Hamlet (2005, Northampton)
 Speaking Like Magpies (2005, RSC)
 The Tempest (2006, RSC)
 Restoration (2006, Headlong/ Bristol Old Vic: UK tour)
 Faustus (2006, Headlong/ Hampstead Theatre)
 The Glass Menagerie (2007, Apollo Theatre)
 Macbeth (2007, Chichester Festival Theatre/ West End/ NYC)
 Rough Crossings (2007, Headlong: Lyric Hammersmith/ Birmingham Rep, Liverpool Everyman/ WYP)
 The Last Days of Judas Iscariot (2008, Headlong: Almeida Theatre)
 Six Characters in Search of an Author (2008, Headlong: Chichester / West End)
 No Man's Land (2008, Gate Theatre, Dublin/West End)
 King Lear (2008, Headlong: Liverpool Everyman/Young Vic)
 Oliver! (2009, Theatre Royal Drury Lane)
 ENRON (2009, Minerva Theatre / Royal Court Theatre)
 Romeo and Juliet (2010, RSC)
 Earthquakes in London (2010, National Theatre)
 The Merchant of Venice (2011 RSC; 2014 Almeida Theatre)
 Decade (2011, Headlong)
 The Effect (2012, National Theatre)
 American Psycho: A new musical thriller (2013, Almeida Theatre)
 King Charles III (2014, Almeida Theatre)
 Made in Dagenham (2014, Adelphi Theatre)
 Medea (2015, Almeida Theatre)
 Richard III (2016, Almeida Theatre)
 Albion (2017, Almeida Theatre)
 Ink (2017, Almeida Theatre / Duke of York's Theatre; 2019, Samuel J. Friedman Theatre)
Shipwreck (2019, Almeida Theatre)
Spring Awakening (2021, Almeida Theatre)

 Writing

 The End of the Affair (1997) – a play with music, adapted with Caroline Butler, from the novel by Graham Greene.  The first production included music played by a pianist at the side of the stage, underscoring the text with some period songs sung by the cast. Goold and Butler removed the music from later productions and the play was published without musical interpolation in 2001.
 Faustus (2004) – adapted with Ben Power from Dr Faustus by Christopher Marlowe
 Six Characters in Search of an Author (2008) – adapted with Ben Power from the play by Luigi Pirandello

Film and television 
 Directing
 Macbeth (TV, 2010)
 Richard II (TV, 2012)
 True Story (2015)
 King Charles III (TV, 2017)
 Judy (2019)

References

External links 
 
 Profile  at Headlong's Official site.

1972 births
Alumni of Trinity College, Cambridge
Commanders of the Order of the British Empire
Critics' Circle Theatre Award winners
English television directors
English theatre directors
Film directors from London
Laurence Olivier Award winners
Living people
People educated at University College School
People from Highgate
Tisch School of the Arts alumni